Timothy Mai Shelpidi (4 September 1948 – 2 March 2018) (Kaltungo, Bauchi State) was the ambassador of the Federal Republic of Nigeria to the Russian Federation.He enlisted in the Nigerian Army in 1967. He started his training at the Nigerian Defence Academy, Kaduna and was commissioned a Regular Combatant Officer on March 4, 1970. 
1990-1992: principal staff officer to Commander-in-Chief of the Armed Forces. After retirement, he went briefly into politics, contesting for the governorship of his home state of Gombe in 2003. Shortly after, there was an attempt on his life. He died on March 2, 2018, at the Federal Medical Center, Abuja, after a protracted illness, and was buried on March 13, 2018, in his home town of Boh, in Shongom Local Government Area of Gombe State.

Qualifications and decorations 
Shelpidi has attended various military courses in Nigeria and overseas. 
 1971: All Arms Tactics Course
 1977 - 1978: Army Command and Staff Course.
 1988: National Defence College, India
 He speaks English, Hausa language and Tangale language.
 He is married and has children.
 Pass Staff College (psc)
 MSC Defensce Studies
 Forces Service Star (fss)
 Meritorious Service Star (mss),
1973 he was Commanding Officer of the 124 Infantry Battalion.
In 1996 he was MAJOR GENERAL (mss, psc, ndc), Chief of Research and Development
In 1997 he was Commander of the Economic Community of West African States Monitoring Group en Guinea Bissau.
From  to  he administrated the Embassy of Nigeria in Moscow.

References 

1948 births
2018 deaths
Nigerian diplomats
Ambassadors of Nigeria to Russia
People from Bauchi State